Mullae-dong is a dong (neighborhood) of Yeongdeungpo-gu in Seoul, South Korea.  The name "Mullae" comes from the neighborhood's old name, "Moraet-mal(모랫말)," which means "Sandy Village" in Korean. 

The neighborhood is most well known for its industrial factories. Because the neighborhood is one the least gentrified areas of Seoul a lot of factories— that manufacture a variety of goods from textile to steel— are present in the area. In fact, there is a street nicknamed "steel factory street" (철공소 거리) due to the abundancy of Metal fabrication factories.

Mullae-dong is also known for art. Numerous art studios in which art exhibitions are sporadically conducted, as well as metal sculptures and commercial graffiti, can be found around the neighborhood. 

The population, as of 2021, is estimated to be 32,870.

See also 
Administrative divisions of South Korea

References

External links
Yeongdeungpo-gu official website
Yeongdeungpo-gu map at The Yeongdeungpo-gu official website
 Mullae 1-dong resident office website

Neighbourhoods of Yeongdeungpo District